Matthew Dwyer (born 18 January 1985) is a Welsh rugby union player. A hooker, he plays club rugby for the Ospreys regional team having previously played for Worcester Warriors, Bridgend RFC.He now plays at Merthyr rfc. He is also a serving soldier in the Welsh Guards and a regular in the British Army first xv .

References

External links
 Ospreys profile

1988 births
Living people
21st-century British Army personnel
Ospreys (rugby union) players
Rugby union players from Newport, Wales
Welsh Guards soldiers
Welsh rugby union players
Rugby union hookers